Joel Whitman (February 1, 1823November 1, 1905) was an American carpenter and Republican politician.  He served two years as a member of the Wisconsin State Senate, representing Iowa County.

Biography
Whitman was born in Wells, New York, in 1823. Later, he moved to Ridgeway, Wisconsin. His son, Platt Whitman, was a member of the Wisconsin State Assembly. Whitman died in Dodgeville, Wisconsin in 1905, where he was also buried.

Career
After serving as a justice of the peace and Clerk of Ridgeway, Whitman was the Wisconsin circuit court clerk for Iowa County from 1860 to 1866.  He represented the 15th State Senate district in  1867 and 1868. Additionally, he was postmaster, a trustee, and village president of Dodgeville.

References

External links

People from Hamilton County, New York
People from Ridgeway, Wisconsin
Wisconsin state senators
Wisconsin postmasters
American justices of the peace
1823 births
1905 deaths
Burials in Wisconsin
People from Dodgeville, Wisconsin
19th-century American politicians
19th-century American judges